Blăgești River may refer to:

Blăgești, a tributary of the Bistrița in Bacău County
Blăgești River (Elan)